Alfred J. Phillips Jr. (born c. 1938) is a Canadian former curler. He was the skip of the 1967 Brier Champion team, representing Ontario. The team later went on to finish third at the World Championships of that year.

Phillips' father Alf Phillips Sr. was an Olympic diver, and represented Ontario at the 1956 Brier.

References

External links
 
 Alfred Jr. Phillips – Curling Canada Stats Archive
 Video:  (YouTube-channel "Curling Canada")

Brier champions
1930s births
Living people
Curlers from Toronto
Canadian male curlers
20th-century Canadian people